Miasteczko Śląskie  (originally Żyglińskie Góry ) is a small town in Upper Silesia in southern Poland, near Katowice. Borders on the Upper Silesian Metropolitan Union - metropolis with the population of 2 million. Located in the Silesian Highlands.

It is situated in the Silesian Voivodeship since its formation in 1999, previously in Katowice Voivodeship, and before World War II, in the Autonomous Silesian Voivodeship. Miasteczko Śląskie is one of the towns of the 2.7 million conurbation – Katowice urban area and within a greater Silesian metropolitan area populated by about 5,294,000 people. The population of the town is 7,437 (2019).

Industry
The largest factory in the town is the Miasteczko Śląskie Zinc Smelter. This metallurgical plant was originally built under license for the British company Imperial Smelting Processes of Bristol. Now a modern plant, ore processing is carried out in a continuous process, producing both zinc and lead. The complex comprises: a sintering plant, a sulphuric acid plant, a rotary furnace, and a lead refinery.

During the 1970s and 1980s, the smelter was a major source of atmospheric emissions of lead and other heavy metals in the northern part of the Katowice Voivodeship. In the early 1990s, several sections of the plant were closed, and modern abatement equipment was installed on the sections left working. This led to the net reduction of heavy metal emissions to air.

References

External links
Official website
Jewish Community in Miasteczko Śląskie on Virtual Shtetl

Cities and towns in Silesian Voivodeship
Tarnowskie Góry County